Denisia is a genus of the concealer moth family (Oecophoridae). Among these, it belongs to subfamily Oecophorinae. It was originally established as a subgenus of Borkhausenia.

Selected species
Species of Denisia include:
 Denisia albimaculea
 Denisia aragonella (Chrétien, 1903)
 Denisia augustella (Hübner, 1796)
 Denisia caucasiella Lvovsky, 2007
 Denisia coeruleopicta (Christoph, 1888)
 Denisia fiduciella (Rebel, 1935)
 Denisia fuscicapitella Huemer, 2001
 Denisia graslinella (Staudinger, 1871)
 Denisia haydenella (Chambers, 1877)
 Denisia luctuosella (Duponchel, 1840)
 Denisia luticiliella (Erschoff, 1877)
 Denisia muellerrutzi (Amsel, 1939)
 Denisia nubilosella (Herrich-Schäffer, 1854)
 Denisia obscurella (Brandt, 1937) (formerly in Buvatina)
 Denisia pyrenaica Leraut, 1989
 Denisia ragonotella (Constant, 1885)
 Denisia rhaetica (Frey, 1856)
 Denisia similella
 Denisia stipella (Linnaeus, 1758)
 Denisia stroemella (Fabricius, 1779) (formerly in Buvatina)
 Denisia subaquilea (Stainton, 1849)
 Denisia yukonella Lvovsky, 2007

Footnotes

References
 Fauna Europaea (FE) (2009): Denisia. Version 2.1, December 22, 2009. Retrieved April 22, 2010.
 Pitkin, Brian & Jenkins, Paul (2004): Butterflies and Moths of the World, Generic Names and their Type-species – Denisia. Version of November 5, 2004. Retrieved April 28, 2010.
 Savela, Markku (2003): Markku Savela's Lepidoptera and some other life forms – Denisia. Version of December 29, 2003. Retrieved April 28, 2010.

Oecophoridae
Moth genera